Yang Shin-young (born 8 November 1990) is a female South Korean short-track and long-track speed skater.

External links
 
 
 

1990 births
Living people
South Korean female speed skaters
South Korean female short track speed skaters
Olympic speed skaters of South Korea
Speed skaters at the 2014 Winter Olympics
Asian Games medalists in short track speed skating
Short track speed skaters at the 2011 Asian Winter Games
Asian Games silver medalists for South Korea
Medalists at the 2011 Asian Winter Games
World Short Track Speed Skating Championships medalists
Place of birth missing (living people)
Universiade silver medalists for South Korea
Universiade medalists in short track speed skating
Competitors at the 2009 Winter Universiade
21st-century South Korean women